The Los Angeles Dodgers took the field before 78,672 fans at the Los Angeles Memorial Coliseum on April 18, 1958, to usher in the beginning of the team's new home in Los Angeles. It was a rough season, as the Dodgers finished 21 games in back of the pennant-winning Milwaukee Braves in the National League standings, but it was the beginning of the second phase for the team. Vin Scully and company moved to KTTV (television) and KMPC (radio) from that year onward, and the Dodgers became one of the first teams that commenced Spanish language radio broadcasts for Latinos, with KWKW as the first station to offer a Spanish-language service.

Offseason

Spring training 
The Dodgers played their first exhibition game as the Los Angeles Dodgers on March 8, 1958. The team faced the Philadelphia Phillies at Miami Stadium. Ron Negray started for the Dodgers and gave up four runs in a 7 to 4 Dodgers loss. The New York Times noted that as much as the game was a historic milestone for the franchise, it was a chance for manager Walter Alston to evaluate players under game conditions, especially catchers, following Roy Campanella's offseason auto accident that ended his career before he could ever play for Los Angeles.

Regular season 
April 15–20, 1958: The Dodgers and Giants played their first six official National League games as representatives of their new cities on the West Coast with back-to-back three-game series, first at Seals Stadium, San Francisco, then at the Los Angeles Memorial Coliseum. The Giants won four of those six games. In the season opener April 15, San Francisco blanked Los Angeles, 8–0, behind Rubén Gómez' complete game, six-hit shutout. Don Drysdale took the loss, and Charlie Neal notched Los Angeles' first hit, a single, in the second inning. In their home opener April 18 in Los Angeles, the Dodgers built a 5–2 lead behind starting pitcher Carl Erskine, and held on to win 6–5. A throng of 78,762 witnessed the event at the Coliseum. Dick Gray, who hit the first home run in Los Angeles Dodger history April 16 in the second game of the 1958 season, also hit the first four-bagger before their home crowd in the seventh inning, giving Los Angeles an insurance run. The Giants nearly tied the game in the ninth inning, but Jim Davenport was ruled out for failing to touch third base after apparently scoring on a triple by San Francisco's Willie Kirkland.

 April 23, 1958: Gil Hodges hit his 300th home run, and Pee Wee Reese played his 2,000th game, on the same day that Duke Snider injured his arm before the game trying to throw a ball out of the Los Angeles Coliseum.

Season standings

Record vs. opponents

Notable transactions 
 June 15, 1958: The Dodgers traded Don Newcombe to Cincinnati Redlegs for Steve Bilko, Johnny Klippstein and players to be named later. The Redlegs completed the deal by sending Art Fowler and Charlie Rabe to the Dodgers on June 23.
 August 4, 1958: Randy Jackson was purchased from the Dodgers by the Cleveland Indians.
 August 15, 1958: Ramón Conde was purchased by the Dodgers from the Philadelphia Phillies.

Roster

Player stats

Batting

Starters by position 
Note: Pos = Position; G = Games played; AB = At bats; H = Hits; Avg. = Batting average; HR = Home runs; RBI = Runs batted in

Other batters 
Note: G = Games played; AB = At bats; H = Hits; Avg. = Batting average; HR = Home runs; RBI = Runs batted in

Pitching

Starting pitchers 
Note: G = Games pitched; IP = Innings pitched; W = Wins; L = Losses; ERA = Earned run average; SO = Strikeouts

Other pitchers 
Note: G = Games pitched; IP = Innings pitched; W = Wins; L = Losses; ERA = Earned run average; SO = Strikeouts

Relief pitchers 
Note: G = Games pitched; W = Wins; L = Losses; SV = Saves; ERA = Earned run average; SO = Strikeouts

Awards and honors 
Gold Glove Award
Gil Hodges

All-stars 
1958 Major League Baseball All-Star Game
Johnny Podres reserve
Johnny Roseboro reserve

Farm system 

LEAGUE CHAMPIONS: Montreal

Notes

References 
Baseball-Reference season page
Baseball Almanac season page

External links 
1958 Los Angeles Dodgers uniform
Los Angeles Dodgers official web site

Los Angeles Dodgers seasons
Los Angeles Dodgers season